Medina is a municipality and town of Colombia in the department of Cundinamarca.

Climate
Medina has a tropical monsoon climate (Köppen Am) with heavy to very heavy rainfall in all months except January.

External links
 Medina official website

References

Municipalities of Cundinamarca Department